Sir George Grimes (1605–1657) was an English politician who sat in the House of Commons from 1628 to 1629. He supported the Royalist cause in the English Civil War.

Grimes was the son of Sir Thomas Grimes and his wife Margaret More, daughter of Sir George More of Loseley Park and was baptised on 10 February 1605. In 1628, he was elected Member of Parliament for Haslemere and sat until 1629 when King Charles decided to rule without parliament for eleven years. Grimes was knighted at Theobalds on 9 December 1628. He  supported the King in the civil war, describing himself as having " for a long time wayted on His Majesty' s person as his sworne servant."
 
Grimes died at the age of about 52 and was buried on 15 October 1657.

Grimes married Alice Lovell, daughter of Charles Lovell, of West Harling, Norfolk.

References

 

1605 births
1657 deaths
English MPs 1628–1629